Wallabout Historic District is a national historic district located in the Wallabout neighborhood of Brooklyn, Kings County, New York. The district encompasses 203 contributing buildings in a mixed residential and commercial / industrial section of Brooklyn.  The district features noteworthy examples of Greek Revival, Gothic Revival, Italianate, Second Empire, Queen Anne, Beaux-Arts, and Colonial Revival style architecture. It largely developed between about 1830 and 1880, with some later development.  It includes vernacular wood houses, masonry single-family rowhouses in brick and brownstone, and multi-family tenements and flat houses.

It was listed on the National Register of Historic Places in 2011.

References 

Historic districts on the National Register of Historic Places in Brooklyn
Greek Revival architecture in New York City
Gothic Revival architecture in New York City
Italianate architecture in New York City
Second Empire architecture in New York City
Queen Anne architecture in New York City
Beaux-Arts architecture in New York City
Colonial Revival architecture in New York City